An oatmeal raisin cookie is a type of drop cookie made from an oatmeal-based dough with raisins. Its ingredients also typically include flour, sugar, eggs, salt, and spices. A descendant of the Scottish oatcake, the oatmeal raisin cookie has become one of the most popular cookies in the United States.

When the cookies were becoming prominent in the United States in the early 1900s, they came to be known as a health food because of the fiber and vitamins from the oatmeal and raisins. Nonetheless, the nutritional value of an oatmeal raisin cookie is essentially the same as a chocolate chip cookie in sugar and calorie content. Depending on how many raisins or oats are added, the fat and fiber content may not be much different either.

History 
In the early Middle Ages, traditional Scottish oatcakes had similar ingredients but were and are typically crispier than modern oatmeal cookies. The first recorded oatmeal cookie recipe was published in the United States by Fannie Merritt Farmer in her 1896 cookbook, the Boston Cooking-School Cook Book. While Farmer's original recipe did not contain raisins, their inclusion grew more common over time, due in part to the oatmeal raisin cookie recipes featured on every Quaker Oats container beginning in the early 1900s.

Variations 

In addition to plain oatmeal cookies, chocolate chips may be added instead of raisins. Other flavorings may be added in addition to the traditional spices.

See also 

Anzac biscuit, made with rolled oats
List of cookies
 Oatmeal Cookie (cocktail)

References 

Cookies
American desserts
Scottish desserts
Oat-based dishes